Daniel A. Shirley (born 13 April 1979) is a male badminton player from New Zealand.

Career
Shirley competed in badminton at the 2004 Summer Olympics in mixed doubles with partner Sara Petersen.  They defeated Philippe Bourret and Denyse Julien of Canada in the first round but lost to Jonas Rasmussen and Rikke Olsen of Denmark in the round of 16.

They also won a bronze medal at the 2005 IBF World Championships in mixed doubles.

Achievements

World Championships

Mixed doubles

Commonwealth Games

Mixed doubles

Oceania Championships

Men's doubles

Mixed doubles

IBF World Grand Prix

Men's doubles

Mixed doubles

IBF International Challenge/Series

Men's doubles

Mixed doubles

References

1979 births
Living people
Badminton players at the 2004 Summer Olympics
Olympic badminton players of New Zealand
New Zealand male badminton players
Commonwealth Games silver medallists for New Zealand
Commonwealth Games bronze medallists for New Zealand
Badminton players at the 1998 Commonwealth Games
Badminton players at the 2002 Commonwealth Games
Badminton players at the 2006 Commonwealth Games
Commonwealth Games medallists in badminton
Medallists at the 1998 Commonwealth Games
Medallists at the 2002 Commonwealth Games
Medallists at the 2006 Commonwealth Games